Alessandra Merlin (born 22 September 1975) is a retired Italian alpine skier who competed in the 1998 Winter Olympics.

External links
 sports-reference.com

1975 births
Living people
Italian female alpine skiers
Olympic alpine skiers of Italy
Alpine skiers at the 1998 Winter Olympics
Universiade medalists in alpine skiing
Universiade gold medalists for Italy
Competitors at the 2003 Winter Universiade